Angel Mae Taylor is a pop singer-songwriter based in the Los Angeles area.

Angel Taylor's debut album, entitled Love Travels was released on iTunes on March 31, 2009, through Aware/Columbia Records. An EP entitled Love Travels EP was released on iTunes in February 2009 prior to the release of Taylor's full debut album featuring several songs from the LP. Her song "Make Me Believe" was offered as the iTunes single of the week during the week of March 30, 2009. Taylor has toured with a variety of artists including Adele, Kate Voegele, Brett Dennen, Brandi Carlile, and Gavin DeGraw. Taylor was a supporting artist along with Five For Fighting, Mat Kearney, and Sugar Ray at various concerts during the summer of 2009.

Taylor was also featured as one of VH1's You Oughtta Know: Artists On The Rise in 2010.

Personal life
Born to mother LaTonya Taylor and an abusive father, Angel Taylor is the youngest of five sisters who had once shared a room together. Her elder sister Ebony Taylor appeared on the fifth season of America's Next Top Model. She has lived in Sylmar, California and Santa Clarita, California.

Early career
Angel's recording career began when she sent an email to producer Mikal Blue who has also worked with Colbie Caillat, Brendan James, and Jason Reeves and this resulted in an invitation to his studio, Revolver Studios. "I played two songs, 'Chai' and 'It's Easy,' and he said he wanted to work with me — I told him all I wanted to do was get my music on a CD, and asked him how long that was going to take, and he said, 'Oh no, I want to really work with you....'"

After only a matter of months, Angel Taylor took her first plane trip to the record label studio in New York and bought her first cellphone.  After signing with Aware/Columbia Records she was able to move, her mother and two of her sisters into their first house. Angel had had no musical school and only started writing poetry because of her sister. Angel Taylor: "Ebony started writing poetry when she was 14, I was 13, and I started writing cheeseball stuff like, 'you're awesome, I think, you're opossum.' It didn't really get real until a few years later, but I never took a lesson - songs happened by me banging on a piano, playing it by ear, and trying to fit my poetry in. I didn't want to be a musician, I just wanted a fun hobby...."

The Voice
She was a contestant on the second season of The Voice, where she picked Maroon 5 lead singer Adam Levine as her coach. Later in the battle rounds she lost to Katrina Parker therefore losing her chance to perform in the live shows.

Discography
Love Travels (2009)
Love Travels EP (2009)
Motion EP (2012)

Taylor's song "Like You Do" was featured in the next to last episode of The CW's One Tree Hill'''s sixth season and a season 2 episode of VH1's Tough Love, where Taylor also performed the song. "Make Me Believe" was featured on 90210 on May 5, 2009.

In 2013, Angel Taylor worked with the California-based DJs, Mako and was the featured vocalist for his song Beam (Dannic Mix). In 2014, she was the featured vocalist on "Up All Night" by Russian DJ Arty which became the first single taken from his 2015 album Glorious. In 2015, she provided the vocals for the song "Make It Right" which was featured on Armin van Buuren's album Embrace''. She has also collaborated with Tritonal on "Getaway", AFSHeeN on "Would It Be Ok", and HARBER on "Me and My Friends". In 2019, she was the vocalist on Morgan Page's single "Reason for Living" which was included in "Beat Saber (Original Game Soundtrack), Vol. III".

References

External links
 Official Twitter
Official MySpace page
Interview at singersroom.com
Interview, Clutch Online

Living people
1988 births
The Voice (franchise) contestants
20th-century African-American women singers
African-American women singer-songwriters
American women singer-songwriters
American women pop singers
Singers from Los Angeles
People from Sylmar, Los Angeles
21st-century American women singers
21st-century American singers
21st-century African-American women singers
Singer-songwriters from California